Guioa normanbiensis is a species of plant in the family Sapindaceae. It is endemic to Papua New Guinea.

References

normanbiensis
Endemic flora of Papua New Guinea
Trees of Papua New Guinea
Vulnerable plants
Taxonomy articles created by Polbot